"Just Got Paid" is a 1988 single by Bahamian R&B singer–songwriter Johnny Kemp.

Background
The song started as an instrumental track by Teddy Riley for which Keith Sweat wrote lyrics. Sweat ultimately passed on the song that was originally written for his 1987 debut Make It Last Forever. Kemp recorded a demo of the new song, intending for it to be used by another singer; his "scratch vocal" ended up on the final release.

Chart performance
The song hit No. 1 on the U.S. R&B and Dance charts and reached No. 10 on the Billboard Hot 100.

Accolades
"Just Got Paid" received a Grammy Award nomination for Best R&B Song at the 31st Grammy Awards in 1989.  It lost out to Anita Baker's "Giving You the Best That I Got".

Covers and sampling

The song was covered by NSYNC on their album No Strings Attached (2000), which was also produced by the song's original producer Teddy Riley. 
The song was covered by CDB on their 2017 album Tailored for Now.
It was sampled by Kurupt on the song "At It Again" off his Space Boogie: Smoke Oddessey album.

In popular culture

The song was used in the 2000 romantic film Love & Basketball.
Kemp performed "Just Got Paid" in an "all-star finale" on Keith Sweat's 2007 DVD Sweat Hotel Live, recorded at a February 2006 concert in Atlanta, Georgia.

Charts

Weekly charts

Year-end charts

References

1987 songs
1988 singles
New jack swing songs
Columbia Records singles
Song recordings produced by Teddy Riley
Songs written by Keith Sweat